Flinders Ranges Way (route B83) is the main road route through the Flinders Ranges in South Australia. It starts from the Augusta Highway at Stirling North, 6 km southeast of Port Augusta. The Flinders Ranges Way extends 209 km to Blinman. Route B83 follows the Flinders Ranges Way through Quorn to Hawker, but then branches onto The Outback Highway along the western side of the ranges through Leigh Creek to Lyndhurst.

Major junctions

References

External links

Roads in South Australia